Mixed-function oxidase is the name of a family of oxidase enzymes that catalyze a reaction in which each of the two atoms of oxygen in O2 is used for a different function in the reaction.

Oxidase is a general name for enzymes that catalyze oxidations in which molecular oxygen is the electron acceptor but oxygen atoms do not appear in the oxidized product. Often, oxygen is reduced to either water (cytochrome oxidase of the mitochondrial electron transfer chain) or hydrogen peroxide (dehydrogenation of fatty acyl-CoA in peroxisomes). Most of the oxidases are flavoproteins.

The name "mixed-function oxidase" indicates that the enzyme oxidizes two different substrate simultaneously. Desaturation of fatty acyl-CoA in vertebrates is an example of the mixed-function oxidase reaction. In the process, saturated fatty acyl-CoA and NADPH are oxidized by molecular oxygen (O2) to produce monounsaturated fatty acyl-CoA, NADP+ and 2 molecules of water.

Reaction

The mixed-function oxidase reaction proceeds as follows:

AH + BH2 + O2 --> AOH + B + H2O (H2O as catalyst.)

Medical significance
High levels of mixed-function oxidase activity has been studied for their activation effects in human colon carcinoma cell lines, to study the susceptibility to certain cancers.  The research has been successful in mice but remains inconclusive in humans.

References

Oxidoreductases